HMY Fairy was a small royal yacht and tender to the . Built in 1844 by Ditchburn and Mare at Leamouth, she was commissioned in 1845.

She was 146 feet long with a beam of 21 feet and was 312 tons burden, and was able to cruise in shallow waters and as well as her duties as a tender, she sailed from London to Scotland, transported Queen Victoria  up and back down the Rhine between Cologne and Bingen during her visit to Germany in 1845, and conveyed the Royal family to the Isle of Wight.

References

External links

 

Royal Yachts of the United Kingdom
Ships built in Leamouth
1845 ships